Lesley David Klim (born 16 January 1995) is a Namibian international rugby union player for RFU Championship side Jersey Reds as a centre or wing. 

Klim joined the Ospreys in 2018 having previously played for Welwitschias and Doncaster Knights.

References

External links 
itsrugby Profile

Namibian rugby union players
Ospreys (rugby union) players
Living people
1995 births
People from Keetmanshoop
Rugby union centres
Rugby union wings
Namibia international rugby union players
Welwitschias players
Doncaster Knights players
Jersey Reds players
Tel Aviv Heat players
Namibian expatriate rugby union players
Namibian expatriate sportspeople in Israel
Expatriate rugby union players in Israel
Expatriate rugby union players in England
Expatriate rugby union players in Jersey
Namibian expatriate sportspeople in Wales
Namibian expatriate sportspeople in England